Birinci Nügədi (also, Birindzhi-Nyugedi, Nyugedi Pervoye, Nyugedi Pervyye, Nyugedy, and Pervyye Nyugedy) is a village and municipality in the Quba Rayon of Azerbaijan.

References 

Populated places in Quba District (Azerbaijan)